Linz am Rhein (in English Linz on the Rhine) is a municipality in the district of Neuwied, in Rhineland-Palatinate, Germany. It is situated on the right bank of the river Rhine near Remagen, approx. 25 km southeast of Bonn and has about 6,000 inhabitants. It is the sister city of Marietta, Georgia in the United States, Linz in Austria and Pornic in France.

Linz is the seat of the Verbandsgemeinde ("collective municipality") Linz am Rhein.

The town is also a destination for tourists thanks to its location next to the Rhine river and its colorful half-timbered houses.

History
The town of Linz was first mentioned in an official document in 874 and called "Lincesce".

Between 1206 and 1214 the parish church of St. Martin was built at the most elevated spot of the town. A former church, which was located at the same place, had been destroyed during the fights of Otto IV and Philip of Swabia in 1198. During reconstruction work in 1981 the remains of graves and foundations belonging to the former church were found.

The most important political decision for Linz was taken in the late Middle Ages. Between 1304 and 1332 Linz was officially awarded city status by the Archbishop of Cologne, Heinrich II of Virneburg. Shortly after having been declared a "city", the castle Burg Linz was built.

In 1391 a fire destroyed two thirds of the city. In 1475 the Emperor's troops occupied Linz during the Neuss War. The town hall, which is one of the major sights of Linz, was built in 1517.

In 1815, Linz became part of Prussia. One year later in 1816 Linz received the status of a district town ("Kreisstadt"). This status was revoked in 1822 and Linz became part of the Neuwied county.

After the Second World War, Linz became a part of Rhineland-Palatinate in 1946.

In the 1970s the city expanded with the new residential area "Roniger Hof". In 1979 the local hospital was put into service.

Gallery

Mayors

 1812–1813: Engelbert Schwamborn
 1817–1820: Friedrich Adolph von Cocy
 1820–1842: Franz Kerp
 1842–1848: Franz Stephan Christmann
 1848–1851: Rudolf Jakob von Gerolt zur Leyen
 1851–1856: Hubert Hubaleck
 1856: Johann Schmitz
 1856–1871: Willibrord Thiesen
 1871–1910: Julius Lerner
 1910–1914: Hugo Menzel
 1914–1932: Paul Pieper
 1933: Eugen Mehliß
 1933: Rahms (given name unknown)
 1933–1938: Franz Weyand, 
 1939–1944: Paul Wiezorke
 1944–1945: Matthias Wagner
 1945: Franz-Josef Wuermeling, CDU
 1945–1947: Wilhelm Hoffmann
 1947–1948: Peter Frings CDU
 1948–1956: Wilhelm Hoffmann
 1956–1972: Leo Thönnissen, SPD
 1972–1974: Theo Lück, SPD
 1974–1979: Hans Breitenbach, CDU
 1979–1989: Theo Lück, first SPD, from 1984 FWG
 1989–2014: Adi Buchwald, CDU
 since 2014: Hans Georg Faust, CDU

Notable people

 Ferdinand von Malaisé (1806-1892); Bavarian General, Educator of King Ludwig III of Bavaria
 Anton Joseph Weidenbach (1809-1871), historian and archivist
 Manfred Bruns (born 1934), Federal Prosecutor at the Federal Court of Justice
 Alex Kempkens (born 1942), photographer
 Osvaldo Bayer (born 1927), German-Argentine anarchist journalist and historian, resided in the town during the 1976-1983 Argentine Dirty War
 Thomas Bierschenk, (born 1951), German ethnologist and sociologist, Professor of African Cultures and Societies at the Institute for Anthropology and African Studies at the University of Mainz.

See also
Martinus-Gymnasium Linz

Notes

External links

 Official website

Populated places on the Rhine
Neuwied (district)
Middle Rhine